J. James Larabee (10 April 1885 – 28 November 1954) was a Liberal party member of the House of Commons of Canada. He was born in Eldon, Prince Edward Island and became a merchant.

He was first elected to Parliament at the Queen's riding in the 1935 general election. On 18 December 1935, slightly more than two months after election, Larabee resigned to become a fisheries protection officer responsible for his province, opening his Parliamentary seat for Charles Avery Dunning, the designated Minister of Finance.

References

External links
 

1885 births
1954 deaths
Canadian businesspeople in retailing
Liberal Party of Canada MPs
Members of the House of Commons of Canada from Prince Edward Island